Leslie Arthur is a former New Zealand rower.

At the 1962 British Empire and Commonwealth Games he won the silver medal as part of the men's eight alongside crew members Darien Boswell, Colin Cordes, Alistair Dryden, Alan Grey, Christian Larsen, Louis Lobel, Robert Page and Alan Webster.

References

New Zealand male rowers
Rowers at the 1962 British Empire and Commonwealth Games
Commonwealth Games silver medallists for New Zealand
Living people
Commonwealth Games medallists in rowing
Year of birth missing (living people)
Medallists at the 1962 British Empire and Commonwealth Games